Dombarton is a rural locality north west of Dapto in the Wollongong LGA, in the Illawarra region of New South Wales, Australia, located on the western side of Lake Illawarra. It is also known for the uncompleted Maldon – Dombarton railway line.

References

Wollongong
Localities in New South Wales